The Drama Desk Award for Outstanding Solo Performance is an annual award presented by Drama Desk in recognition of achievements in the theatre among Broadway, Off Broadway and Off-Off Broadway productions. The category was first presented at the 1984 ceremony, when it was known as the Drama Desk Award for Outstanding One-Person Show. The award has been known by its current name since 1999.

Winners and nominees

1980s

1990s

2000s

2010s

2020s

Notes

References

External links
 Drama Desk official website

One-Person Show
Theatre acting awards
Awards established in 1984
1984 establishments in the United States